This is a list of women writers who were born in Estonia or whose writings are closely associated with that country.

A
Kai Aareleid (born 1972), prose writer, poet, translator
Margit Adorf (born 1974), journalist, poet
Eda Ahi (born 1990), poet, translator 
Silvia Airik-Priuhka (1926–2014), writer, translator
Ave Alavainu (1942–2022), poet
Betti Alver (1906–1989), poet, novelist, translator
Epp Annus (born 1969), writer and literary scholar
Elisabeth Aspe (1860–1927), novelist and short story writer
Elise Aun (1863–1932), poet

B
Aimée Beekman (born 1933), writer, novelist
Maimu Berg (born 1945), writer, critic, translator, journalist
Piret Bristol (born 1968), poet, prosaist, novelist

D
Hilda Dresen (1896–1981), translator, poet, Esperantist

E
Kristiina Ehin (born 1977), poet, translator, singer, songwriter
Salme Ekbaum (1912–1995), writer, poet

H
Anna Haava (1864–1957), poet, translator, writer
Lehte Hainsalu (born 1938), poet, novelist, children's author 
Aime Hansen (born 1962), poet, writer, artist
Viiu Härm (born 1944), poet, novelist, children's writer
Marie Heiberg (1890–1942), poet, short story writer
Kärt Hellerma (born 1956), journalist, editor, poet, short story writer, children's writer, literary critic
Kadri Hinrikus (born 1970), children's writer, journalist

J
Merle Jääger (born 1965), poet, novelist, actress
Piret Jaaks (born 1980), dramatist, playwright, poet, journalist, children's writer

K
Maie Kalda (1929–2013), literary scholar, critic
Elvy Kalep (1899–1989), aviator, artist, children's writer
Kätlin Kaldmaa (born 1970), writer, poet, translator, literary critic
Aino Kallas (1878–1956), Finnish-Estonian short story writer, diarist, playwright 
Maarja Kangro (born 1973), poet, short story writer, librettist
Doris Kareva (born 1958), poet, translator
Merle Karusoo (born 1944), playwright, biographer, theatre director
Kristiina Kass (born 1970), children's writer, illustrator
Leida Kibuvits (1907–1976), writer
Veronika Kivisilla (born 1978), poet, critic
Lydia Koidula, pen name of Lydia Emilie Florentine Jannsen (1843–1886), early poet, playwright, journalist, translator
Ilmi Kolla (1933–1954), poet

L
Herta Laipaik (1921–2008), novelist, short story writer, poet
Anu Lamp (born 1958), translator, actress
Eha Lättemäe (1922–2012), poet 
Viivi Luik (born 1946), poet, essayist, children's writer

M
Heljo Mänd (1926–2020), poet, editor, novelist, children's writer
Helmi Mäelo (1898-1978), writer, activist
Kersti Merilaas (1913–1986), poet, children's writer, playwright, translator
Ene Mihkelson (1944–2017), poet, novelist, essayist, short story writer
Reed Morn (1898–1978), novelist and short story writer
Kati Murutar (born 1967), prose writer, screenwriter, journalist

N
Ellen Niit (1928–2016), children's writer, poet, translator
Dagmar Normet (1921–2008), novelist, essayist, playwright
Minni Nurme (1917–1994), poet, prosaist

O
Liisi Ojamaa (1972–2019), poet, translator, literary critic, editor

P
Imbi Paju (born 1959), journalist, film director, working in Finland
Eeva Park (born 1950), poet, novelist
Aino Pervik (born 1932), children's writer, translator
Epp Petrone (born 1974), journalist, blogger, children's writer, publisher
Asta Põldmäe (born 1944), short story writer, children's writer, translator
Ketlin Priilinn (born 1982), writer, translator, journalist
Lilli Promet (1922–2007), journalist, novelist, essayist, short story writer

R
Helju Rebane (born 1948), prose writer, science fiction writer
Astrid Reinla (1948–1995), children's writer, short story writer, screenwriter

S
Mari Saat (born 1947), novelist, short story writer
Ly Seppel (born 1943), poet, translator
Marta Sillaots (1887–1969), novelist, children's writer, translator, literary critic
Kertu Sillaste (born 1973), children's writer

T
Andra Teede (born 1988), poet, playwright, screenwriter
Leida Tigane (1908–1983), prose writer, children's writer
Tiia Toomet (born 1947), children's writer, poet
Leelo Tungal (born 1947), children's writer, novelist, librettist

U
Kauksi Ülle (born 1962), writer, poet
Marie Under (1883–1980), poet
Eia Uus (born 1985), novelist, short story writer

V
Debora Vaarandi (1916–2007), writer
Kätlin Vainola (born 1978), children’s writer, poet
Aidi Vallik (born 1971), children's writer, poet, playwright, translator, columnist, screenwriter
Elo Viiding (born 1974), poet, short story writer

W
Hella Wuolijoki (1886–1954), Estonian-born Finnish novelist writing under the pen name Juhani Tervapää

See also
List of Estonians
List of women writers

References

-
Estonian women writers, List of
Writers
Women writers, List of Estonian